Abdulrahman Al Roomi is a former Saudi Arabian football defender who played for Saudi Arabia in the 1992 Asian Cup. He also played for Al Shabab.

References

External links

1969 births
Living people
Saudi Arabian footballers
Saudi Arabia youth international footballers
Saudi Arabia international footballers
1992 King Fahd Cup players
1992 AFC Asian Cup players
Al-Shabab FC (Riyadh) players
Asian Games medalists in football
Footballers at the 1986 Asian Games
Asian Games silver medalists for Saudi Arabia
Association football defenders
Medalists at the 1986 Asian Games